Mount Capps is a  mountain in the Alaska Range, in Denali National Park and Preserve, southwest of Denali on a ridge between Denali and Mount Crosson, close to Kahiltna Dome and at the heads of Peters Glacier and Kahiltna Glacier. Mount Capps was named in 1952 by after U.S. Geological Survey geologist Stephen Reid Capps.

See also
Mountain peaks of Alaska

References

Alaska Range
Mountains of Denali National Park and Preserve
Mountains of Alaska
Mountains of Denali Borough, Alaska